The Division of Dawson is an Australian electoral division in Queensland. It covers areas around the city of Mackay.

Geography
Since 1984, federal electoral division boundaries in Australia have been determined at redistributions by a redistribution committee appointed by the Australian Electoral Commission. Redistributions occur for the boundaries of divisions in a particular state, and they occur every seven years, or sooner if a state's representation entitlement changes or when divisions of a state are malapportioned.

History

The division was created in 1949 and is named after Anderson Dawson, the first Labor Premier of Queensland and leader of the first parliamentary socialist government anywhere in the world. It is located on the North Queensland coast, taking in the towns of Ayr, Bowen, Mackay, Proserpine and some south-eastern suburbs of the city of Townsville.

Apart from a period from 1966 to 1975 and 2007 to 2010, it has been held by the National Party.  While Mackay, the largest city wholly within the electorate, is a longstanding Labor stronghold, it is usually not enough to overcome the region's overall conservative leaning.

Members

Election results

References

External links
 Division of Dawson (Qld) — Australian Electoral Commission

Electoral divisions of Australia
Constituencies established in 1949
1949 establishments in Australia
Federal politics in Queensland